Zoe Dirse is a Canadian cinematographer, film director, writer and professor. She is best known for her cinematography work for Studio D under the National Film Board of Canada, the first government-funded film studio in the world dedicated to women filmmakers.

Career 
Before her work in film and television, Dirse earned a degree in psychology and teaching at the University of Toronto. While in university, she took some theoretical film courses and fell in love with French New Wave cinema. When she began her career in the film industry in 1979, she was one of only two female camera assistants in IATSE 644. Her first “break” in her career began when she was called to work by producer Christa Singer on the documentary Adoption Stories for TVOntario. Brought in as an assistant, Dirse was hired to help the teenage subjects of the documentary feel “less threatened” by having her behind the camera. After shooting Adoption Stories, Dirse began working on commercial shoots as well as second-unit and second-assistant jobs on numerous Hollywood and television projects. Upon looking for more varied work, Dirse sought to work on films that involved social change, ultimately leading her to the National Film Board of Canada, where she worked from 1982 until 1997.

While working at the National Film Board of Canada, Dirse worked on over 70 film projects, including a number of groundbreaking documentaries produced by Studio D including: Wisecracks (1992); Forbidden Love: the Unashamed Stories of Lesbian Lives (1992); and Jane Rule: Fiction and Other Truths (1996). As the camera department closed at the NFB in 1997, Dirse moved to Toronto to start her own company titled Zoe Dirse Productions. While developing documentaries, features, and movies for television, Dirse pursued a master's degree in Fine Arts degree at York University. During her time at York, a lecture she gave at a conference in 2003 resulted in her theory of the female gaze in film being published in Women Filmmakers: Refocusing.

Since 2000, Dirse has taught cinematography and documentary at Sheridan College in Oakville, Ontario. She currently holds a position on the board of directors for the Canadian Society of Cinematographers.

Female gaze 
Dirse looks at the female gaze through her cinematography work in the documentary film genre, analyzing aspects of pleasure and viewer identification. She analyzes the gaze at the points of production (not reception), and "perception" being where sexual difference happens. She notes that if "the bearer of the look is female, the subject is female, and the subject subverts the gaze and gazes at herself". Dirse argues that having a female cinematographer alters the experience for both female and male subjects, and the perception of the film changes, citing her experiences of being shoved while filming in a crowd of men, and going by nearly unnoticed when filming intimate moments between women. She concludes that the female gaze is necessary in all forms of art, as it is mostly absent from dominant culture.

Praise and criticism 
Dirse was awarded in 2018 by Women In Film & Television Toronto (WIFT) with the Mentorship Award, due to her "collaborative spirit" and willingness to guide first-time directors. Longtime collaborator Lynne Fernie praised Dirse for having “an incredible gift for relating to the people she's filming so that they are relaxed and open when the camera is rolling... When we were shooting the interviews for Forbidden Love, she not only lit the women beautifully, she enjoyed meeting and talking to each woman. So when the lights turned on and the camera began to roll - we were shooting in 16mm - our subjects were very comfortable talking about sexuality and telling difficult stories about their lives even while surrounded by all of this technology and our crew.”

Awards and honours 

 Rogers-DOC Luminary Award, 2018
 WIFT Mentorship Award, 2018

Selected filmography 
{| class="wikitable"
|+
!Year
!Film
!Role
!Notes
|-
|1981
|Circle of Two
|Second assistant camera
|
|-
|1983
|Flamenco at 5:15 
|Assistant Camera
|Won at the 56th Academy Awards for Documentary Short Subject.
|-
|1984
|Margaret Atwood: Once in August
|Cinematographer
|
|-
|1986
|Firewords, Part 1-3
|Cinematographer
|
|-
|1988
|A Song for Quebec
|Cinematographer
|
|-
|1990
|The Burning Times 
|Additional/assistant camera
|
|-
|1991
|Sisters in the Struggle
|Cinematographer
|
|-
|1992
|Wisecracks
|Cinematographer
|
|-
|1992
|Forbidden Love: The Unashamed Stories of Lesbian Lives 
|Cinematographer
|Won at the 14th Genie Awards for Feature Length Documentary.
Won the GLAAD Media Award for Outstanding Film (Documentary)
|-
|1993
|Kanehsatake: 270 Years of Resistance
|Cinematographer
|Won the Silver Sesterce at Visions du Réel festival in 1993, a Special Jury Award given to a cinematographic work.
Won Best Canadian Film at the 1993 Toronto International Film Festival.
|-
|1993
|Long Time Comin'''
|Cinematographer
|
|-
|1993
|Baltic Fire|Director; Cinematographer
|Dirse's directorial debut
|-
|1994
|Motherland: Tales of Wonder|Cinematographer
|
|-
|1996
|A Balkan Journey: Fragments from the Other Side of War|Cinematographer
|
|-
|1997
|Erotica: A Journey Into Female Sexuality|Cinematographer
|
|-
|1998
|Shadow Maker: Gwendolyn MacEwen, Poet|Cinematographer
|
|-
|2004
|Madame President|Director; Cinematographer; Writer
|
|-
|2010
|Sisters in Arms|Cinematographer
|
|}

 References 

 Further reading 
Dirse, Zoe (2013), “Gender in Cinematography: Female Gaze (Eye) behind the Camera,” Journal of Research in Gender Studies'' 3(1): 15–29.

External links

Year of birth missing (living people)
Living people
Canadian women cinematographers
Canadian women film directors
University of Toronto alumni
York University alumni
Academic staff of Sheridan College
Canadian documentary film directors
Canadian cinematographers
National Film Board of Canada people
Canadian women documentary filmmakers